Mitromorpha decussata is a species of sea snail, a marine gastropod mollusk in the family Mitromorphidae.

Description

Distribution
This marine species occurs off France.

References

+ Dujardin, Félix. Mémoire sur les couches du sol en Touraine et description des coquilles de la craie et des faluns. Société géologique de France, 1837.

External links
 

decussata
Gastropods described in 1837